Farewell Waltz (German: Abschiedswalzer) is a 1934 German musical drama film directed by Géza von Bolváry and starring Wolfgang Liebeneiner, Richard Romanowsky and Hanna Waag. It is based on the life of the composer Frédéric Chopin.

The film's sets were designed by the art director Emil Hasler and Arthur Schwarz. A separate French-language version Song of Farewell was also produced.

Cast
 Wolfgang Liebeneiner as Frédéric Chopin
 Richard Romanowsky as Professor Elsner
 Hanna Waag as Constantia Gladkowska
 Julia Serda as Madame Gladkowska, her mother
 Sybille Schmitz as George Sand
 Hans Schlenck as Franz Liszt
 Gustav Waldau as Friedrich Kalkbrenner
 Paul Henckels as Ignaz Pleyel
 Albert Hörrmann as Alfred De Musset
 Erna Morena as Herzogin von Orleans
 Margarete Schön as Madame Mercier
 Herbert Dirmoser as Titus
 Fritz Odemar as Grabowsky, trader
 Kurt Middendorf as Victor Hugo
 Walter Gross as Waiter

References

Bibliography 
 Raykoff, Ivan . Dreams of Love: Playing the Romantic Pianist. OUP USA, 2014.

External links 
 

1930s musical drama films
German musical drama films
1934 films
German historical films
1930s historical films
Films set in the 19th century
Films of Nazi Germany
1930s German-language films
Films directed by Géza von Bolváry
1930s German films